Kita Ouest is a rural commune in the Cercle of Kita in the Kayes Region of south-western Mali. The commune contains 16 villages and in the 2009 census had a population of 14,966. The main village (chef-lieu) is Kofeba.

References

External links
.

Communes of Kayes Region